HelloWallet is an online and mobile application for employees founded by former Brookings Institution scholar Matt Fellowes and based in Washington, DC.  It provides personalized financial guidance to members and relies on behavioral economics to incentivize workers to implement its advice.

The company has generated press attention for its SaaS enterprise products, from sources including The Wall Street Journal, The Washington Post, Bloomberg Businessweek, Washington Business Journal, and Tech Crunch.

In May 2017, KeyBank acquired HelloWallet from Morningstar, Inc.

Business model

HelloWallet is primarily distributed through employers as a workplace financial wellness benefit. In January 2014, HelloWallet partnered with The Vanguard Group to provide guidance on managing debt, spending wisely, and maximizing company benefits to Vanguard's plan participants. Members track their spending, create financial goals, and receive guidance on saving for emergencies, retirement, and health expenses within the application.

HelloWallet has a double bottom line mission: for every five memberships sold, the company gives one free subscription to a family in need through a partnership with a community organization. The company's philanthropic largest partners are Goodwill. and Iraq and Afghanistan Veterans of America.

HelloWallet relies on behavioral economics and a group of academic advisors from Dartmouth College, the RAND Corporation, George Washington University, Stanford University, University of Wisconsin–Madison, and the Brookings Institution. In 2013, O'Reilly Media published the first book from HelloWallet Principal Scientist, Dr. Steve Wendel. In the book, Designing for Behavior Change, Dr. Wendel introduces a framework for how individuals can design, build, and test products that successfully change behavior.

Recognition

In 2013, HelloWallet won a Webby Award for the Best Financial Services & Banking Website category, a W3 Award for Best Financial Services Website, and a Best In Biz Award for Enterprise Software Product of The Year.

In April 2013, in celebration of Financial Literacy Week, the New York Stock Exchange invited executives from HelloWallet to ring the opening bell and participate in the NYSE Euronext Workplace Financial Fitness Forum.

ABC News included HelloWallet in an article titled “Five Cool Start-ups To Keep an Eye on" in 2010.

HelloWallet's founder and CEO, Matt Fellowes, was chosen in 2010 as a The Huffington Post GameChanger, along with Steve Jobs, Paul Volcker, Jeff Skoll, James Cameron, and 94 others. The company was chosen in 2009 to participate in the Clinton Global Initiative and was singled out as an example of social innovation business by President Bill Clinton on Larry King.

Funding
The company was created with support from the Rockefeller Foundation in 2009. In 2010, it raised additional funds from AOL founder Steve Case, Jean Case, Grotech Ventures, and a group of private individuals.

In January 2012, HelloWallet received $12 million in Series B funding, led by Chicago-based Morningstar, Inc. and DC-based TD Fund.

References

External links
 http://www.hellowallet.com

Financial services companies of the United States
Software companies based in Washington, D.C.
Privately held companies based in Washington, D.C.
Defunct software companies of the United States
2009 establishments in Washington, D.C.
Software companies established in 2009
Financial services companies established in 2009
2017 mergers and acquisitions